José López Domínguez (29 November 1829, in Marbella – 17 October 1911, in Madrid), was a Spanish military officer and politician who served as Prime Minister of Spain between 6 July and 30 November 1906.

Biography 
As a lieutenant of the artillery, he participated in the pronunciamiento of Leopoldo O'Donnell in 1854. He was sent as observer to the Crimean War and the Second Italian War of Independence. In 1859 - 1860 he fought in the Spanish-Moroccan War and reached the rank of colonel.

He joined the Liberal Union Party, and was elected as deputy several times. Related to general Serrano, he participated with him in the Revolution of 1868 and the Battle of Alcolea, in which the loyalists under Manuel Pavía were defeated. López Dominguez was promoted to General.

In 1871, he became Mariscal de campo and personal military advisor to King Amadeo I of Spain.
In 1873, he was appointed commander of the Army of the North against the Carlists in the Third Carlist War, But in the same year, he was asked by Emilio Castelar to lay siege to Carthagena, where the Cantonal Revolution had broken out. He had the city intensively bombarded and on 12 January 1874 Cartagena was retaken. He then returned to the North and liberated Bilbao, which was under siege by the Carlists.

In 1874, under the new Serrano government, he became captain general of Catalonia. 
In 1883, he was Minister of War in the Posada Herrera Government and also between 1892 and 1895 in the Sagasta Government.

During the Second Melillan campaign, he became Captain-General and was also representative of Malaga in the Spanish Senate, a chamber of which he became the President between 1905 and 1907.

In July 1906, aged 77, he became Prime Minister of Spain with a government supported by José Canalejas. The first months, he was also Minister of War. 
After a plot within his own party, led by Segismundo Moret, he was forced to resign after five months.

After his resignation, he retired from politics and died 5 years later in Madrid.
In 1908, he was given the Toison de Oro, or Order of the Golden Fleece.

Sources

Links 
 Biografias y vidas
 Expediente personal del Senador D. José López Domínguez, por la provincia de Málaga y por derecho propio on the site of the Spanish Senat

1829 births
1911 deaths
Prime Ministers of Spain
Spanish captain generals
Captains General of Catalonia
Spanish generals
Members of the Senate of Spain
People from Marbella
Knights of the Golden Fleece of Spain
Presidents of the Senate of Spain
Spanish military personnel of the Third Carlist War (Governmental faction)